Umur Ghazi, Ghazi Umur, or Umur The Lion (Modern Turkish: Aydınoğlu Umur Bey, c. 1309–1348), also known as Umur Pasha was the second Turkish bey of Aydin, on the Aegean cost of Anatolia, from 1334 to 1348. He was famous for his naval expeditions. As a writer, poet and patron of the arts and sciences,  Kalila wa-Dimna  was first translated to Persian during his reign.

Career
Umur was described in an epic chronicle Düstürnâme-i Enverî, written by poet and historian Enveri during the reign of Sultan Mehmed II, as "the 'Lion of God' leading a just and holy war of conquest against the 'miscreants' and infidel Christians". According to an unreliable but colorful source, two Venetian ambassadors remarked that he was immensely fat with a stomach "like a wine casket". They had found him wearing silks, drinking almond milk and eating eggs with spices from a golden spoon. Umur Ghazi was a loyal ally and friend of Emperor John Cantacuzenus of the Byzantine Empire and provided him with material aid during his military campaigns, especially during the Byzantine civil war of 1341–1347. He apparently sent 380 ships and 28,000 men to aid him in the conflict and besieged the city of Demotika in Thrace, Greece. The emperor John reportedly mourned his death. At the height of its power, the Emirate of Aydin possessed 350 ships and 15,000 men.

Umur's preying on Christian shipping led to the declaration of the Smyrniote crusades against him by Pope Clement VI in 1343. In 1348, his fleet was destroyed by an allied fleet from Venice, the Knights of Rhodes and Cyprus. Umur was killed by a barrage of arrows, climbing the walls of Smyrna Castle during a recapture attempt. His older brother Hızır Bey was appointed in his place.

Modern İzmir's district Gaziemir (Ghazi Emir) is named after him.

References

Sources
 
 

1348 deaths
Turkic rulers
Aydınids
Monarchs killed in action
Year of birth uncertain
Byzantine–Turkish wars
14th-century monarchs in Asia
Smyrniote crusades